St. Thomas Airport may refer to:

 Cyril E. King Airport on the island of St. Thomas in the United States Virgin Islands
 St. Thomas Municipal Airport (North Dakota) in St. Thomas, North Dakota, United States
 St. Thomas Municipal Airport (Ontario) in St. Thomas, Ontario, Canada